Caseolus is a genus of land snails in the family Geomitridae.

The name Caseolus is masculine and means "little cheese", based on the shape of the shell of this species.

Species
Species include:
 Caseolus abjectus R. T. Lowe, 1831
 Caseolus baixoensis Walden, 1983
 Caseolus bowdichianus (Férrusac, 1832)
 Caseolus calculus R. T. Lowe, 1855
 Caseolus calvus R. T. Lowe, 1831
 Caseolus commixtus R. T. Lowe, 1855
 Caseolus consors R. T. Lowe, 1831
 Caseolus galeatus (R. T. Lowe, 1862)
 Caseolus hartungi Albers, 1852
 † Caseolus heberti (Deshayes, 1863)
 Caseolus innominatus J. E. Gray, 1825
 Caseolus leptostictus R. T. Lowe, 1831
 Caseolus pittae (Paiva, 1866)
 Caseolus punctulatus G. B. Sowerby I, 1824
 Caseolus setulosus (R. T. Lowe, 1831)
 † Caseolus sphaerulus R. T. Lowe, 1852
 Caseolus subcalliferus Reeve, 1854

References

 Bank, R. A. (2017). Classification of the Recent terrestrial Gastropoda of the World. Last update: July 16, 2017

External links
  Lowe, R. T. (1855 ["1854"]). Catalogus molluscorum pneumonatorum insularum Maderensium: or a list of all the land and freshwater shells, recent and fossil, of the Madeiran islands: arranged in groups according to their natural affinities; with diagnoses of the groups, and of the new or hitherto imperfectly defined species. Proceedings of the Zoological Society of London. 22: 161-208 [16 March 1855]; 209-218
 Lowe, R. T. (1852). Brief diagnostic notices of new Maderan land shells. The Annals and Magazine of Natural History. (2) 9 (50): 112-120; (2) 9 (52): 275-279. London 

 
Gastropod genera